is a Buddhist temple of the Tendai sect in the city of Utsunomiya, Tochigi Prefecture, in northern Kantō region of Japan. The temple is famous for its bas-relief carvings on a cliff face. The honzon of the temple is a bas-relief stone statue of Senjū Kannon. The temple is 19th stop on the Bandō Sanjūsankasho pilgrimage route of 33 temples sacred to Kannon in the Kantō region.

History
The history and foundation of the temple is uncertain, but it appears to date from the late Nara period to early Heian period. The temple is located in a valley which contains the ruins of a Jōmon period settlement. According to the temple's own legend, it was founded by Kūkai in 810 AD after he returned from Tang dynasty China. The temple became part of the Bandō Sanjūsankasho route in the Kamakura period. It was under the protection of the powerful Utsunomiya Futaarayama Jinja and the Utsunomiya clan through the Muromachi period. The temple was rebuilt in the early Edo period by Kamehime, the eldest daughter of Shōgun Tokugawa Ieyasu, with the assistance of Tenkai as a resting place between Edo and the Shrines and Temples of Nikkō. The temple has burned down on several occasions, and most of its documentary history has been lost. Its precincts were excavated in 1965, and Buddha statues from the Kamakura period, votive stones dated 1363, and a copper bowl dated 1551 were found.

Ōya Stone Buddhas
The   is a set of ten bas-relief carvings of various Buddhist divinities located on a cliff at Ōya-dera. These carvings were designated a National Historic Site of Japan in 1926 and reclassified as a Special National Historic Site in 1954.

The carvings are located on the wall of a large natural cave on the southwestern side of a hill made of Ōya stone called Otomeyama. The wall is divided into four large and small quadrants. In the first quadrant, facing west, is a statue of Senjū Kannon with a height of four meters. This is the honzon image of the temple. According to temple legend, the statue was carved by Kūkai himself, and was once covered by lacquer and gold leaf. In the second quadrant is a sitting image of Shaka Nyōrai with a height of 3.5 meters, flanked to the left and right by Monju Bosatsu and Fugen Bostasu. The statue in the third quadrant a sitting Yakushi Nyōrai with a height of 1.2 meters, flanked by Nikkō Bosatsu and Gakkō Bosatsu. The fourth quadrant is believed to be a seated Amida Nyōrai with a height of 2.6 meters, flanked by status of Kannon Bosatsu and Seishi Bosatsu. In addition, several sitting images depicted on the wall on the right side of the Kannon statue, and a statue of a Buddha above.

The statues of Senjū Kannon and Yakushi Nyōrai are believed to date from the early Heian period, with the statue of Shaka Nyōrai from the late Heian period, and the remaining statues from the late Heian to early Kamakura period.

These statues are regarded as having extremely high artistic and academic value, along with the more famous Usuki Stone Buddhas in Oita Prefecture, and the carvings were also designated an Important Cultural Property of Japan in 1986.

The temple complex also includes a small museum.  Across from the temple is an Ōya stone quarry that has been converted into a park.  The park features a massive statue of Kannon, called the  created after World War II.

See also
List of Historic Sites of Japan (Tochigi)

References

External links

Tochichi Prefecture Department of Education home page 
Utsunomiya Convention & Visitor's Bureau home page 
Oya-dera official home page

Utsunomiya
Special Historic Sites
Tendai temples
History of Tochigi Prefecture
Shimotsuke Province
Buddhist temples in Tochigi Prefecture
Important Cultural Properties of Japan